Vincent A. De Gaetano (born 17 August 1952 in Sliema) is a Maltese judge, serving since 2010 as judge of the European Court of Human Rights in respect of Malta. Since 3 November 2010 he is Vice-President of Section IV.

De Gaetano succeeded Giovanni Bonello, who, together with two other candidates, had been proposed in 1998 by then Prime Minister Alfred Sant. The election of a Maltese judge for the ECHR had been protracting since 2004, with the Parliamentary Assembly of the Council of Europe twice rejecting the Maltese Government's all-male lists.

De Gaetano had served from 2002 till 2010 as Chief Justice of Malta.

References

1952 births
Living people
Judges of the European Court of Human Rights
People from Sliema
Maltese judges of international courts and tribunals
Chief justices of Malta